Charles Burnett may refer to:

Charles Burnett (director) (born 1944), American film director
Charles Burnett (officer of arms) (born 1940), Scottish Officer of Arms
Charles Burnett (RAF officer) (1882–1945), Royal Air Force officer and Australian Chief of the Air Staff
Charles Hiram Burnett Sr., treasurer of the city of Seattle and businessman
Charles Burnett (politician) (1875–1947), New Zealand politician
Charles Burnett (British Army officer) (1843–1910), British Army general
Charles Burnett of the Burnett baronets
Charles Burnett III (died 2018), British land-speed record holder for steam driven vehicle

See also
Burnett (surname)
Charlie Barnett (disambiguation)